The Sideways Trilogy is a series of three comedic wine themed novels by Rex Pickett which include Sideways, which was the basis of a 2004 film directed by Alexander Payne, Vertical and Sideways 3 Chile.

Overview

The trilogy spans approximately eight years in the life of its main protagonist, a writer named Miles. At the beginning of Sideways, Miles is a mostly unsuccessful screenwriter and functioning alcoholic who is taking his best friend Jack, a successful TV director, on a trip to California's wine country the week before the latter's wedding. Vertical takes place seven years later, during which time Miles has found literary success with the publication of a novel based on the adventures he and Jack experienced in the trilogy's preceding installment. Jack, on the other hand, has seen his fortunes decline following a divorce and an increasing alcohol problem. Sideways 3 Chile picks up about one year later, and features Miles taking a trip to Chile to research an article for a wine magazine.

Novels
 Sideways (2004) 
 Vertical (2010) 
 Sideways 3 Chile (2015)

Stage and musical adaptions
In 2019 it was announced that Sideways was scheduled to be adapted for a Broadway musical. A play adapted by author Rex Pickett from the Sideways novel was produced at multiple theaters in the United States and the United Kingdom, including at the La Jolla Playhouse.

In addition to the musical, it was reported that Rex Pickett had written screenplays based on his two Sideways sequels already in print, Vertical and Sideways 3 Chile.

References

Literary trilogies
American novels adapted into films
American novel series
Books about wine
English-language novels
St. Martin's Press books